Ludwigia grandiflora, commonly referred to as Water primrose, is an aquatic plant of the order Myrtales.

It is closely related and easily confused with Ludwigia hexapetala. The two species can be distinguished at a chromosomal level, because L. grandiflora is hexaploid and L. hexapetala is decaploid. However, they can be distinguished morphologically. L. grandiflora has villous hairs, smaller flowers and smaller pollen grains. Some authorities consider that these differences are too slight to consider these different species and so separate these taxa as two varieties or two subspecies.

Invasive species 
Ludwigia grandiflora has been listed on the List of Invasive Alien Species of Union concern since 2016 and in the United States it is on the South Carolina State-listed Noxious Weed list. It out-competes other plants by forming dense mats at the margins and in ponds. It is introduced to warm temperate areas of North America, Japan and Europe and has formed large stable populations, particularly in France.

Life history 
Ludwigia grandiflora can, and does, produce viable seed, but it is also highly effective at vegetative reproduction and apparently recruitment of new plants from seed is low. The large showy flowers attract a wide variety of insects. A study in Belgium, where L. grandiflora is introduced, showed that the flowers are visited by a wide variety of insects including bees, Lepidoptera, beetles and hoverflies.

See also
Alternanthera philoxeroides

References

grandiflora
Aquatic plants
Taxa named by André Michaux